Arnold Anderson may refer to:

 Arnold Anderson (athlete) (1912–1996), New Zealand track and field athlete
 Arnold Anderson (scientist), Six Nations Tuscarora tribal member who worked with Albert Einstein as a chemical engineer on the Manhattan Project
Arnold Anderson (baseball), played in 1938 St. Louis Cardinals season